The Bracebridge Blues were a Canadian Junior ice hockey team based in Bracebridge, Ontario, Canada.  They played in the Greater Metro Junior A Hockey League (GMHL).

History
The Phantoms were announced on April 14, 2012, by the GMHL. In 2014, after a rough season and some ownership woes, the team was supposed to move out of the GMHL and into the rival Canadian International Hockey League. The GMHL ownership stepped in and stopped the move. In April 2014, the ownership of the team was changed by the league and the team became the Bracebridge Blues. After playing five games and forfeiting the sixth game of the 2016–17 season, the Blues were removed from the GMHL schedule.

Season-by-season standings

References

External links
Blues Webpage
GMHL Webpage

2012 establishments in Ontario
Bracebridge, Ontario
Ice hockey clubs established in 2012
Ice hockey teams in Ontario